Meneripitiya Appuhamillage Don David Karunaratne was a Ceylonese politician.

Karunaratne was elected to parliament at the 1st parliamentary election, representing the United National Party (UNP), for the Gampaha electorate. He secured 11,786 votes (38% of the total vote), 3,370 votes ahead of the Lanka Sama Samaja Party candidate, C. A. Mathew, who received 27% of the total vote.

Karunaratne had two daughters, Chandra Charlotte and Edith. Chandra married Percy Jayakoda, who was the MP for Divulapitiya.

Karunaratne was a wealthy landowner in the Gampaha District, owning a number of coconut and rubber plantations. In the 1930s he constructed a palatial walauwa, called Agra, in Bendiyamulla. The 1966 film Parasathu Mal, directed by Gamini Fonseka, was filmed on the property.

References

Alumni of St. John's College, Panadura
United National Party politicians
Members of the 1st Parliament of Ceylon
Date of birth missing
Date of death missing